Joan Murrell Owens (June 30, 1933 – May 25, 2011) was an American educator and marine biologist specializing in corals.  She received degrees in geology, fine art, and guidance counseling. She described a new genus, Rhombopsammia, and three new species of button corals, R. niphada, R. squiresi, and Letepsammia franki.

Early life and family

Joan Murrell was born on June 30, 1933, in Miami, Florida, to William and Leola Murrell.  She was the youngest of their three daughters. Her father was a dentist.  Encouraged by her parents, from an early age Joan became interested in the life of the oceans, and she hoped to study marine biology professionally.  Her father was an avid fisherman who took his wife and daughters on weekend fishing trips, during which Owens became interested in marine life. One of her favorite books was The Silent World by Jacques Cousteau. Murrell graduated from Miami's Booker T. Washington High School in 1950 and was awarded two scholarships, one from the Pepsi-Cola Company and a Sarah Maloney (Art Scholarship) at Fisk University. Joan entered Fisk University in 1950.  The scholarships subsidized part of her education with her father paying the major portion of her tuition. However, the university did not offer a program in the marine sciences.  Instead, she majored in fine art and received her degree in 1954; her minors were mathematics and psychology.  For graduate study, Murrell entered the University of Michigan with the intention to study commercial art, but she changed her focus.  She received a Master of Science degree in guidance counseling with an emphasis on reading therapy in 1956.

Teaching and research

Joan Murrell taught for two years at the University of Michigan's Children's Psychiatric Hospital, and then joined the faculty of Howard University in Washington, D.C. in 1957, where she specialized in teaching remedial English.  In the 1960s, she moved to Newton, Massachusetts.  While there, for the Institute for Services to Education she designed programs for teaching English to educationally disadvantaged students.  This work served as a model for the Upward Bound program of the United States Department of Education.

She returned to Washington; with a renewed interest in marine biology, and the encouragement of her friend and colleague Philip Morrison, she entered George Washington University in 1970. As that institution had no undergraduate program in marine science, she constructed an equivalent with a major in geology and a minor in zoology.  She received her B.S. in geology in 1973 and her M.S. in 1976.  Continuing work toward her doctorate, she returned to Howard as a professor of geology in 1976.  Because Owens had sickle cell anemia traits, her research was limited by her inability to dive underwater to search for specimens. Instead, she did a laboratory project at the Smithsonian Institution, working with coral samples collected by a British expedition in 1880. Her doctoral research concerned certain species of deep-sea button corals, a group of stony corals that are distinctive in that they do not form colonies.  Her dissertation was titled "Microstructural Changes in the Scleractinian Families Micrabaciidae and Fungiidae and their Taxonomic and Ecologic Implications." She received her PhD from George Washington University in 1984.

Now publishing as Joan Murrell Owens, she continued her laboratory work at the Smithsonian, classifying and studying button corals, while advancing to the rank of associate professor in the department of geology and geography at Howard University in 1986.  She described the new genus Rhombopsammia and its two species in 1986, and added a new species to the genus Letepsammia in 1994, naming L. franki for her husband, Frank A. Owens.  Both genera are in the family Micrabaciidae.

Joan Owens transferred to the biology department of Howard in 1992 when the department of geology and geography was phased out, and retired from full-time work in 1995.

Later life and death

Joan Owens died on May 25, 2011.  She was survived by her sister, Willette M. Carlton; two daughters, Adrienne Lewis and Angela Owens; and a granddaughter, Chara Johnson.

Selected publications

References

1933 births
2011 deaths
American marine biologists
American geologists
American paleontologists
People from Miami
Fisk University alumni
University of Michigan School of Education alumni
George Washington University alumni
Women marine biologists
20th-century American women scientists
20th-century American scientists